Senator Ketcham

John H. Ketcham (1832–1906), New York State Senate
Winthrop Welles Ketcham (1820–1879), Pennsylvania State Senate